The Blue Cross of Hyderabad is an animal welfare Society founded in 1992 by Indian film actors Nagarjuna, Amala Akkineni and animal friendly citizens. Blue Cross of Hyderabad was later registered as a society in 1993 and is recognized by Animal Welfare Board of India.

Located in Hyderabad, Blue Cross of Hyderabad presently runs a two-acre animal shelter from where 9 projects for the welfare of animals are conducted all year round. The campus is surrounded by hills and vast open spaces housing over 650 animals of different species.

Also learn about 
 Blue Cross of India
 Animal welfare and rights in India
 Blue Cross

References

Animal welfare organisations based in India
Animal charities based in India
1992 establishments in Andhra Pradesh
Animal rescue groups
Dog welfare organizations
Animal rights organizations